The Cumbrian Coast line is a rail route in North West England, running from Carlisle to Barrow-in-Furness via Workington and Whitehaven. The line forms part of Network Rail route NW 4033, which continues (as the Furness line) via Ulverston and Grange-over-Sands to Carnforth, where it connects with the West Coast Main Line.

History
George Stephenson favoured, and carried out preliminary surveys for, a scheme to link England and Scotland by a railway running along the coast between Lancaster and Carlisle, but this 'Grand Caledonian Junction Railway' was never built, the direct route over Shap being preferred. Consequently, the line along the Cumbrian coast is the result of piecemeal railway building (largely to serve local needs) by a number of different companies:

Maryport and Carlisle Railway

Carlisle to Maryport

Promoted to link with Newcastle and Carlisle Railway to give "one complete and continuous line of communication from the German Ocean to the Irish Sea" and to open up the northern (inland) portion of West Cumbrian coalfield. Act of Parliament obtained 1837; first section – Maryport to Arkleby (just short of Aspatria) – opened 1840: line Maryport–Carlisle fully opened 1845. Originally laid single; doubled throughout (to accommodate heavy and profitable mineral traffic) by 1861. Remained independent (and highly profitable) until grouping.

Whitehaven Junction Railway
Maryport to Whitehaven (Bransty) (leased by London and North Western Railway 1865; amalgamated with LNWR 1866).

Whitehaven at this time was dominated by the Lowther family, and its head the Earl of Lonsdale. Attempts supported by William Lowther, 1st Earl of Lonsdale to promote a  'Whitehaven, Maryport and Carlisle Railway' in 1835, had lost out to the Maryport and Carlisle Railway. In 1844 a more limited project for a railway between Whitehaven and Maryport (supported by Lord Lonsdale and both MPs for West Cumberland) got its parliamentary Act. The first Earl had died earlier in 1844, and it was his son, the second Earl, who became chairman of the company and remained so throughout its existence. The line was opened from Maryport to Workington at the end of November 1845, and to Harrington mid-May 1846 Between Whitehaven and Harrington the line ran between cliffs and the sea and landslips, rockfalls, and high tides made construction problematical.  A train ran all the way from Maryport to Whitehaven on 19 February 1847, but the passengers left it at Harrington; the line opened for passenger traffic 18 March 1847.

In 1848 two Acts were obtained; one to authorise the raising of further capital to cover overspend on the construction of the existing line, one to make the link with the Whitehaven and Furness Junction Railway (W&FJR) by an elevated railway running to the harbour and then along the harbour front. The harbour link was never built (the W&FJR deciding to proceed with their original intention of a tunnel) but lines were laid down to serve the North Pier. There were continuing difficulties with the sea walls on the Whitehaven-Harrington section, which were now described as of bad and inefficient design and executed in a worse and more objectionable manner; in 1851 the seawall was rebuilt at Harrington and Lowca at a cost of £6000. However, when in January 1852 a storm badly damaged the seawall immediately north of Whitehaven station (the wall, the embankment behind it, and the railway track being completely destroyed for a length of about fifty yards,) the damaged section pre-dated the railway. A further storm in December 1852 caused more extensive damage, the repaired section being lost again as a consequence of failure of the old wall immediately north of it (there were further wash-outs at Lowca and Risehow), but services were resumed within a fortnight. The link to the WJR from the W&FJR was made (as originally intended) by  a tunnel, completed at the end of September 1852; a joint working agreement with the W&FJR took effect at the start of 1854. In December 1855, Bransty station shut for goods business and the Preston Street station of the W&FJR became the WJR's goods station for Whitehaven.

In 1856, the company secretary was replaced after an audit suggested about £3,000 had gone missing (the loss was made good by 'the directors' -in fact Lord Lonsdale alone – from his own pocket), and the company engineer resigned because of the defective state of the engines and the inefficiency of previous repairs but the WJR was entering an era of prosperity (by 1864 it was declaring a dividend of 15%) largely because of a boom in haematite mining. It was reported that in 1856, the quantity of iron ore raised in the neighbourhood of Whitehaven was 259,167 tons. Of this 152,875 was shipped at Whitehaven, 65,675 sent away by rail, and 39,617  tons used at the iron works in the district. The destinations of the ore were as follows: – Wales, 124,630 tons; Staffordshire 26,768 tons; Scotland 15,865 tons, Newcastle, Middlesbro &c, 51470 tons; and to France 817 tons.

A branch to the wet dock at Maryport opened September 1859 and carried considerable traffic from collieries at Flimby; the line (hitherto single throughout) was widened from Maryport to Flimby and doubled throughout by 1861. The original Railway Hotel at Bransty was bought for use as station buildings and offices for the two Whitehaven companies, the Cockermouth and Workington Railway's half-share of Workington station was bought out, and timber viaducts at Workington and Harrington were replaced, the Board of Trade objecting to the use of timber in the Harrington replacement, especially given the WJR's prosperity: "The continued use of this material in the present instance by the directors of a company ... whose receipts are ... £53 per mile per week is quite inexcusable." The WJR reached an agreement (1864) with the Cockermouth and Workington to lease the C&WR, guaranteeing a 10% dividend to C&WR  shareholders, but did not get parliamentary approval for the necessary Bill, the Whitehaven, Cleator and Egremont Railway objecting that the lease would obstruct any movement of ore northwards except over the WJR The WJR then (June 1865) reached agreement with the London and North Western Railway for the LNWR to lease the WJR in perpetuity, paying 10% a year. (The LNWR reached a similar agreement with the Cockermouth and Workington, and the Furness Railway with the W&FJR); the Bill making the amalgamation permanent received its royal assent in July 1886. In the first six months of operation by the LNWR, the profit on the line was said to be 27% a year.

When the Whitehaven – Harrington section was first opened the Carlisle Journal – politically opposed to the Lowther interest – had criticised it : "Zig-zag, zig-zag, zig-zag, perpetually.  No serpent wriggles in more contortions than the Whitehaven Junction Railway" and pointed out the horrors of an accident on such a corniche "The poor wretches who fill the train must either have their brains dashed out against the rocks at one side or be pitched head-foremost into the sea on the other" Train crew could never see far ahead, and there was always the possibility of a rockfall onto the track: even after the doubling of the line, the Board of Trade required a speed limit of 15 mph on the section. In 1860, whilst the section was still single-track, a heavy iron-ore train broke down on this section and a mistake by the station-master at Whitehaven led to a low-speed collision between a portion of the train being returned to Whitehaven and a passenger train advancing to push the failed train to Harrington. Sixteen passengers were injured, two seriously; the accident (together with another low-speed collision in 1862) was said to have cost the WJR about £20,000 in compensation alone, and the vulnerability of the WJR dividend to any further accident was one of the arguments adduced in support of the lease to the LNWR.

Whitehaven and Furness Junction Railway
Whitehaven to Foxfield (leased by Furness Railway 1865, amalgamated 1866).

The first Earl of Lonsdale had supported the idea of a railway linking Whitehaven to Maryport, but had had no interest in building a railway south of Whitehaven, let alone one linking to the West Coast Main Line : however he died in 1844 and was succeeded by his son William Lowther, 2nd Earl of Lonsdale who supported the scheme and under his chairmanship the Whitehaven and Furness Junction Railway obtained its Act in the next session of Parliament. and in 1846 a further Act for extension of the W&FJR to a junction with the WJR near the latter's Whitehaven station. There was little potential local traffic, and the hope was for the through traffic which would flow once the  W&FJR was extended to a junction with the Lancaster and Carlisle Railway south of Carnforth.  However a Bill for that extension was rejected because of inconsistencies in its documentation  and it was left to others to provide a link between Lancaster and Furness, and to Lord Lonsdale to nurse the company until better times arrived.

By 1847, the company was becoming concerned that remaining funds would be insufficient to tackle the remaining expensive engineering  (the tunnel to reach the Whitehaven station of the WJR and a 2-km long viaduct across the Duddon estuary to join the Furness Railway near Kirkby Ireleth). In 1848 Bills were brought forward to make the link with the WJR by an elevated railway running to the harbour and then along the harbour front and for abandoning the Duddon crossing to Kirkby Ireleth, the line instead turning back on itself to follow the west bank of the Duddon estuary upstream to a much shorter crossing to a junction with the Broughton-in-Furness branch of the Furness Railway at Foxfield.

The 16 km section of line from Mirehouse (2 km south of Whitehaven) to the River Calder,  already used for construction traffic, was used to move coal to depots at Braystones and Sellafield in February 1849, marking its opening for goods traffic. The first passenger services between a temporary station at Preston Street (at the southern edge of Whitehaven) and Ravenglass followed an official opening on 21 July 1849. Bootle became the southern terminus of passenger services in July 1850: the last section between Bootle and Foxfield was opened for passenger services 1 November 1850 although trains carrying Lord Lonsdale and invited guests had travelled from Whitehaven to Broughton-in-Furness over the section on at least two previous occasions. The link to the WJR station at the north of the town was made (as originally intended) by  a tunnel, completed at the end of September 1852. A tramway through the market place allowing goods waggons to be horse-drawn from Preston Street to the south end of the harbour, authorised by an Act of 1853 was completed in 1854; a joint working agreement with the WJR took effect at the start of 1854. From December 1855 W&FJR passenger trains ran to the WJR station at Bransty; Preston Street became the goods station for both lines and a passenger station was opened at Corkickle, immediately south of the tunnel.  The goods portion of north-bound mixed trains was detached  some distance from Corkickle and run into Preston Street under gravity.

The opening of the Whitehaven, Cleator and Egremont Railway brought considerable additional mineral traffic onto the W&FJR at its northern end: at the southern end, a through route southward from Whitehaven was finally achieved with the completion of the Ulverstone and Lancaster Railway in 1857, reflecting this an additional curve was laid down at the junction with the Furness Railway and W&FJR trains ran to Foxfield or Ulverston rather than Broughton. To facilitate the export of haematite southwards, in 1864 the W&JR (now paying a previously unheard-of 8% dividend) projected a direct crossing of the Duddon estuary (to eliminate the dog-leg through Foxfield) in competition with a similar proposal by the Furness Railway; disagreement with the Whitehaven, Cleator and Egremont as to who should build a line from the WC&ER at Egremont to the W&FJR at Sellafield was deferred by the W&FJR's charges being reduced, and both companies (temporarily) dropping their plans to build the line, subsequently agreeing to promote as a joint line.  The WW&FJR got its Bill for the Duddon crossing, but then agreed to be leased by the Furness Railway for a guaranteed 8% a year.

Furness Railway

Foxfield to Barrow-in-Furness.

Incorporated 1844; promoted by Duke of Buccleuch and Earl of Burlington (later Duke of Devonshire) to link iron ore mines (at Dalton-in-Furness) and slate mines (at Kirkby-in-Furness) with Barrow harbour. Open Barrow- Kirkby in 1846, extended to Broughton in Furness 1848.

All the above constituents were absorbed into the London, Midland and Scottish Railway in 1923.

Current passenger services
Train services are operated by Northern. Services stop at all stations (although many are request stops), with the exceptions of Nethertown and Braystones, which are served by four trains a day in each direction.

In the December 2013 – May 2014 timetable, the following trains operated on weekdays:

 Southbound – 19 trains per day
 Carlisle to Barrow-in-Furness – 9 trains per day, of which 2 continue to Lancaster and 1 to Preston
 Carlisle to Whitehaven – 4 trains per day, of which 1 begins at Newcastle
 Maryport to  – 1 train per day
 Whitehaven to Barrow-in-Furness – 1 train per day
 Sellafield to Lancaster – 1 train per day
 Millom to Barrow-in-Furness – 3 trains per day, 1 of which continues to Lancaster
 Northbound – 19 trains per day
 Barrow-in-Furness to  – 3 trains per day, of which 1 begins at Lancaster
 Barrow-in-Furness to Sellafield – 1 train per day
 Whitehaven to Carlisle – 4 trains per day
 Whitehaven to Workington – 1 train per day

There are no trains after 19:30 each evening between Millom and Whitehaven, as this section is only open for 12 hours each day due to the high operating costs associated with the large number of signal boxes and staffed level crossings that are present.  Services are slightly altered on Saturdays and on Sundays there is no service between Barrow and Whitehaven, with four trains in each direction between Whitehaven and Carlisle.

A new Sunday service is to be introduced (now scheduled for the May 2018 timetable change) over the section south of Whitehaven after the new Northern Rail franchise agreement came into effect in April 2016 – the new operator (Arriva Rail North Ltd) will also be running an additional six weekday trains each way as part of the new 10-year agreement with the Department for Transport.

At Carlisle the lines connects to the: West Coast Mainline; the Settle-Carlisle Line; the Tyne Valley Line; the Glasgow South Western Line; and the Caledonian Sleeper service. At Barrow, there are connections to the Furness Line.

Passenger rolling stock

Due to restricted clearances on the section of line between Maryport and Carlisle, as several overbridges were built to narrower than normal dimensions by the M&CR, Class 150's, Class 158's, Class 195's and many other diesel multiple units are banned from the route because of their width. Services are therefore operated by Class 156 units. The line has also been previously operated by Class 142 Pacer units, but these have since been phased out in favour of Class 156 Sprinters cascaded from Abellio ScotRail. Class 153's have also previously worked along the route but these are now off lease from Northern being replaced by Class 156's. 

In the past, the Class 108 first generation DMUs, formerly used on the line, were custom-fitted with bars on the drop-light doors for this reason.  Since 2006, Network Rail have eased clearance restrictions so as to allow Mark 1, Mark 2 and Mark 3 coaching stock to operate along the full route, although under strict instructions that all drop-light windows must be either stewarded or locked between Maryport and Carlisle to prevent passengers from putting their heads out of the windows.  This has allowed many charter services to operate the full length of the Cumbrian Coast.  Since the May 2015 timetable change, a number of scheduled services between Carlisle & Barrow were operated using Mark 2 coaches, a DBSO and Class 37 diesel locomotives hired in from Direct Rail Services to provide additional seating capacity – these were modified accordingly which included placing bars across the droplight windows.  These workings reverted to DMU operation at the end of December 2018.

It is mandatory that passengers remain in their seats whenever steam tours travel between Maryport and Carlisle in both north and southbound directions; this is because most West Coast Railways Mark 1 coaches, which are used by charter companies, don't have bars across the droplight windows. Steam railtours using the route had, until recently, been banned because of the restricted clearances as well as the fear of injury to members of the public. The width of some steam engines prohibits them from working along the routes, steam locos which have travelled along the route in recent years include: LMS Black 5's, LMS 8F's, LMS Jubilee's & LMS Royal Scot's.

The Cumbrian Coast was given Community Rail status in 2008 and has an active Community Rail Partnership working hard to develop the route.

Towns and villages along the route
 Carlisle
 Dalston
 Wigton
 Aspatria
 Maryport
 Flimby
 Workington
 Harrington
 Parton
 Whitehaven
 Corkickle
 St Bees
 Nethertown
 Braystones
 Sellafield
 Seascale
 Drigg
 Ravenglass
 Connection for the Ravenglass and Eskdale Railway (La'al Ratty)
 Bootle
 Silecroft
 Millom
 Green Road
 Foxfield
 Kirkby-in-Furness
 Askam-in-Furness
 Barrow-in-Furness

Route description

2009 floods
In the aftermath of the 2009 floods, an extra hourly service between Maryport and Workington operated stopping at all stations in between, including the temporary Workington North. These services were withdrawn in December 2010.

Historical Connecting lines

The following lines all previously connected to the Cumbrian Coast Line, but have mostly now been closed

 Silloth branch, from Aspatria
 Brigham branch, near Maryport
 Cleator and Workington Junction Railway, near Workington
 Cockermouth and Workington Railway, near Workington
 Whitehaven, Cleator and Egremont Railway, near Corkickle (this was the main connection: the Gilgarran branch of the WC&ER also connected at Parton). 
 Cleator and Furness Railway, near Sellafield
 Ravenglass and Eskdale Railway, at Ravenglass.  This is a narrow gauge railway which still runs services for tourists, but there was formerly a standard gauge line from Ravenglass to Murthwaite for freight.
 Coniston Branch, near Foxfield
 Sandscale branch, at Barrow in Furness

Notes

References

External links

Network Rail: Rules of the Route and Rules of the Plan

Rail transport in Cumbria
Transport in Barrow-in-Furness
Railway lines opened in 1844
Railway lines in North West England
Standard gauge railways in England